The Sulitjelma Glacier (also: , , or ) is one of the largest glaciers in mainland Norway. The  glacier is located in mostly in Norway, but the eastern part crosses over into Sweden. The Swedish part (where it is referred to as Salajekna) lies on the border of Arjeplog Municipality and Jokkmokk Municipality in Norrbotten County. When the whole glacier is considered, it is the largest glacier in Sweden.

The glacier has retreated in recent years. The lake Låmivatnet lies just south of the glacier.

Stockholm University operates an automatic weather station near the glacier front.

See also
List of glaciers in Norway

References 
 The largest glaciers in Norway

Notes

Glaciers of Sweden
Glaciers of Nordland
Fauske
Landforms of Norrbotten County